Aneirin is a crater on Mercury. It has a diameter of 467 kilometers. Its name was adopted by the International Astronomical Union (IAU) on June 13, 2014. Aneirin is named for the Welsh poet Aneirin.  Prior to naming, the crater was referred to as b37.

Darío crater lies on the western rim of Aneirin.

References

Impact craters on Mercury